Persons is a surname. Notable people with the surname include:

Amber Persons (DOB 1978), Author and TV Host
Robert Persons (1546–1610), English Jesuit priest
Ell Persons, African American lynched in 1917
Enos Warren Persons (1836–1899), American politician
Gordon Persons (1902–1965), American politician and 43rd Governor of Alabama
Henry Persons (1834–1910), American politician, lawyer, and soldier
Peter Persons (born 1962), American professional golfer
Wilton Persons (1896–1977), White House Chief of Staff to President Dwight D. Eisenhower

See also
Person (surname)